Maria Ikonina (1788–1866), was a Russian Empire ballerina.  She was engaged at the Imperial Russian Ballet in 1806–1829, where she was a soloist and regarded as an elite member during her career. She was trained by Charles Didelot, who regarded her as one of his best pupils.

References

Ballerinas from the Russian Empire

1788 births
1866 deaths
19th-century ballet dancers from the Russian Empire